Leptophis nigromarginatus, commonly known as the black-skinned parrot snake, is a snake of the family Colubridae.

Geographic range
It is found in the Amazon Rainforest in Ecuador.

Description

L. nigromarginatus is a bright green, slender, medium-sized, snake. Adults are typically  in total length. Black edges around the outer margin of each scale form a distinctive net-like pattern on the dorsal surface of the animal. The ventral surface has a metallic sheen, and may be green or rust-colored.

Habitat
It is arboreal, living in dense brushy vegetation. It is found in secondary and primary forest.

Behavior
Active during the daytime, it sleeps in vegetation at night.

Diet
It feeds on lizards, frogs, and small birds.

References

Further reading
 Günther, A. 1866. Fifth Account of new Species of Snakes in the Collection of the British Museum. Ann. Mag. Nat. Hist., Third Series 18: 24-29. ("Ahætulla nigromarginata", p. 28.)

Colubrids
Snakes of South America
Reptiles of Ecuador
Endemic fauna of Ecuador
Taxa named by Albert Günther
Reptiles described in 1866